Harold Duncan Dunbar (1 October 1900 – 12 June 1975) was an Australian rules footballer who played with Melbourne in the Victorian Football League (VFL).

Notes

External links 

1900 births
Australian rules footballers from Victoria (Australia)
Melbourne Football Club players
1975 deaths
People from Traralgon